The counts of Montfort were a German noble dynasty from Swabia. They belonged to high nobility of the Holy Roman Empire and enjoyed the privileged status of imperial immediacy.

The influential and wealthy counts of Montfort took their name from an ancestral castle named Montfort, which was situated close to today's Swiss border near Weiler, in the present-day Austrian state of Vorarlberg.

As the lords of Feldkirch (until 1390), Bregenz (until 1523), and Tettnang (until 1779), they would have a decisive influence on the development of not just Voralberg, but also Upper Swabia and Eastern Switzerland.

History

The counts held the lordships of the County of Feldkirch (until 1390), County of Bregenz (until 1523) and Tettnang (until 1779). They had territories in Upper Swabia and particularly in Vorarlberg, most of which they ruled. Until the 18th century, the counts were a remarkable family of the high nobility, the most important in the region of Lake Constance, but the line eventually became extinct. In a number of places, including Feldkirch, Bregenz and Langenargen, there are still signs of their history.

The counts of Montfort were originally a branch of another Swabian noble family, the counts palatine of Tübingen. Hugo II of Tübingen (d. 1182) married Elizabeth of Bregenz, and through her, Hugo would take ownership over the former territories of the counts of Bregenz, including Bregenz itself, Montfort, and Sigmaringen, making him a dominant power in the region. His marriage to Elizabeth would also provide him with close family ties to Emperor Frederick I Barbarossa and the Welfs (like Barbarossa and Henry the Lion, Elizabeth was a grandchild of the Welf duke Henry IX of Bavaria).

Upon the death of Hugo II, the majority of the former Bregenz territories would go to his second son, Hugo III (d.1228/1230), who after about 1200 would style himself "Hugo of Montfort". His territories as count included Raetia Curiensis, Tettnang, Bregenz, Feldkirch, Sonnenberg, Werdenberg, and Sargans. The new House of Montfort would adopt the arms of the County Palatine of Tübingen, but the Montfort arms would feature a red gonfalon on a silver shield instead of a gold one.

Hugo's older brother Rudolph I (1160-1219) continued the original line of the counts palatine; nevertheless, five generations later Gottfried II (d.1369) would be forced to sell Tübingen to the County of Württemberg and drop the title of count palatine in favor of the ordinary Count of Tübingen. He did, however, inherit Lichteneck via his wife Clara of Freiburg, and thenceforth his descendants would bear the title Count of Tübingen-Lichteneck. Next to Montfort-Tettang, this line would be the longest-lasting branch of the family, lasting until 1664.

Around 1779, Tettnang was sold to the Austrian House of Habsburg in order to pay debts. Several years later, the line became extinct upon the death of Count Anton IV in 1787. The Habsburgs added the Montfort lands to their Further Austrian possessions.

Montfort-Feldkirch 

Hugo I of Montfort founded Feldkirch in the early years of the 13th century, building his castle (called "Schattenburg") on a hill overlooking the town. The town and castle would become the focal point of the Montfort-Feldkirch territories, with Schattenburg taking the place of the original Montfort castle. In 1375, burgrave Rudolph IV of Montfort sold the fiefdom to the Habsburg Duke Leopold III of Austria.

Montfort-Bregenz 

Hugo II of Tübingen (†1182) inherited the County of Bregenz via his wife, Elizabeth of Bregenz. The Montfort-Bregenz branch of the dynasty continued until the middle of the 14th century, when its lands fell to Montfort-Tettnang, which starting in 1354 would be known as Montfort-Tettnang-Bregenz. This house would produce at least one figure of historical significance, the minstrel (Minnesänger) and statesman Hugo of Montfort (1357–1423).

In 1362 Hugo inherited the lands of the counts of Pfannberg via his wife Margaret. Hugo took residence at Pfannberg Castle in 1401, joining the Styrian nobility. The family would sell Pfannberg Castle in 1524 and move their residence to Peggau Castle, renaming themselves Montfort-Bregenz-Beckach (the contemporary form of Peggau).

In 1451, a portion of the Montfort-Bregenz territory was sold to the Habsburgs by Elizabeth of Hochberg, heir of Count William VII (†1422) of Montfort. The rest of the original Bregenz territories would be sold in 1523, though the Styrian branch of the family retained the Montfort-Tettnang lands until the extinction of the dynasty in 1787.

Counts of Montfort

Below, a list of the counts of Montfort, numbered by order of ascension:

House of Tübingen

Partitions of Montfort under Tübingen rule

Table of rulers

(Note: Here the numbering of the counts is the same for all counties, as all were titled Counts of Montfort, despite of the different parts of land or particular numbering of the rulers. The counts are numbered by the year of their succession.)

Prince of Montfort

In 1810, the Tettnang territory was adjudicated to the Kingdom of Württemberg. In 1816, King Frederick I vested his daughter Catharina and her husband Jérôme Bonaparte with the titles of Princess and Prince of Montfort (French: prince de Montfort). This princely title continued in the family by descent.

See also
Tettnang Castle
Werdenberg

Sources
 Burmeister, Karl Heinz:  Montfort, von (Grafen von Montfort), Familienartikel in: Neue Deutsche Biographie, Bd. 18, S. 51-54
 Burmeister, Karl Heinz: Die Grafen von Montfort. Geschichte, Recht, Kultur. Festgabe zum 60. Geburtstag, hrsg. von Alois Niederstätter (= Forschungen zur Geschichte Vorarlbergs; NF 2). Universitätsverlag Konstanz, Konstanz 1996, 
 Burmeister, Karl Heinz; Kuhn, Elmar L., Moser, Eva u.a.: Die Grafen von Montfort. Geschichte und Kultur. (= Kunst am See; Band 8). Gessler, Friedrichshafen 1982,

References

External links

Genealogy of the counts of Montfort

Montfort
Monfort
History of Vorarlberg
Upper Swabia